Cuma or CUMA may refer to:

Places and jurisdictions 
In Europe
 Cuma (Euboea), former name of Kymi, a coastal town on Euboea island, Greece
 Cuma (Italy), an ancient Greek colony, near Naples
 its Diocese of Cuma (Italy), former bishopric and present Latin titular see
 Monte di Cuma, a mountain near Licola, Italy, in Naples province
 Cuma-ı Bala, an old Turkish name for Blagoevgrad in Bulgaria
 Eski Cuma, an old Turkish name for Targovishte in Bulgaria

Elsewhere
 Cuma (Aeolis), an Aeolian city in Asia Minor
 its Diocese of Cuma (Asia Minor), former bishopric and present Latin titular see
 Cuma, Azerbaijan, a village in Azerbaijan
 Cuma, Namibia, a village in the Rundu Rural East constituency of Namibia

People 
 Tyler Cuma, a Canadian major junior ice hockey defenceman
 Cuman people, nomadic people in Eurasia

Mythology 
 Čuma, a personification of plague in Serbian mythology

Abbreviations 
 CUMA, a type of frogman's rebreather designed and made in Canada
 Canadian Urban Music Awards, awards given by the Urban Music Association of Canada

See also 
 Kuma (disambiguation)
 Kymi (disambiguation)